Appenzell is a village, though considered as a town by the FSO, and the capital of the canton of Appenzell Innerrhoden in Switzerland. Appenzell has no municipal government of its own; rather, the different parts of Appenzell belong to and are governed by the districts Appenzell, Schwende and Rüte. Because of that, for firefighting, energy and water, the village Appenzell has a special-purpose municipality, the Feuerschaugemeinde.

History 
In 1071 the village was referred to as Abbacella. By 1223 this changed to Abbatiscella, meaning the Abbot's cell. This refers to the abbot of the Abbey of Saint Gall.

The buildings in the village core, the parish church, the 1563 town hall, the Salesis house, the ruins of Castle Clanx and the state archives with the administration building are listed as heritage sites of national significance.

Notable people 
 Roman Signer (born 1938 in Appenzell) a visual artist who works in sculpture, art installations photography, and video.

Gallery

References

External links
 
Appenzell Tourism
Appenzell 

 
Cultural property of national significance in Appenzell Innerrhoden
Cantonal capitals of Switzerland
Cities in Switzerland